Kappa Boötis (κ Boo, κ Boötis) is a double star in the constellation Boötes. It has the traditional name Asellus Tertius  (Latin for "third donkey colt") and the Flamsteed designation 17 Boötis. The components are separated by an angular distance of 13.5 arcsec, viewable in a small telescope. Kappa Boötis is approximately 155 light years from Earth.

Nomenclature
κ2 Boötis, the brighter star of the pair, is also designated HD 124675, while κ1 Boötis is HD 124674.  The two stars share the Bright Star Catalogue designation HR 5328, but they have separate entries in the Hipparcos catalogue: HIP 124675 and HIP 124674 respectively.

Properties

κ1 Boötis is a spectroscopic binary star system.  The visible primary is an F2 main sequence star, while the secondary is half the mass and much fainter.

κ2 Boötis is classified as a Delta Scuti type variable star with a period of 1.08 hours Its brightness varies from magnitude +4.50 to +4.58.  It is a slightly evolved A8 subgiant.

A 17th-magnitude star nearly two arc-minutes away has been identified as a member of the multiple system with an estimated orbital period of 177,000 years.  It is itself a close binary with two similar low-mass stars in a 234-year orbit.

Etymology
This star, along with the other Aselli (θ Boo and ι Boo) and λ Boo, were Aulād al Dhiʼbah (أولاد الضّباع - awlād al-ḍibā‘), "the Whelps of the Hyenas".

References

External links
 HR 5329
 HR 5328
 CCDM J14135+5147
 Image Kappa Boötis

Boötes
Binary stars
Delta Scuti variables
Double stars
A-type subgiants
F-type main-sequence stars
Asellus Tertius
Bootis, Kappa
124674 5
069481
5328
BD+52 1782
Boötis, 17